Football Club Kairat, commonly called FC Kairat, is a Kazakh professional association football club based in Almaty, whose first team play in the highest tier of Kazakh football, Kazakhstan Premier League, as of the 2015 season.

List of head coaches
 Leonid Pakhomov
 Timur Segizbayev
 Leonid Ostroushko
 Nikolai Starostin (1952–53)
 Vsevolod Bobrov (1975)
 Boris Stukalov (Jan 1, 1991–Dec 31, 1991)
 Kurban Berdyev (1994–95)
 Vladimir Nikitenko (Jan 1, 1996–Dec 31, 2000)
 Zlatko Krmpotić (2001–02)
 Vladimir Gulyamhaydarov (2003)

Managerial statistics
, Managers in italics were hired as caretakers.

References

Notes

Footnotes

External links
FC Kairat official website

 
Kairat